Jeff Burch is a Canadian politician, who was elected to the Legislative Assembly of Ontario in the 2018 provincial election. He represents the electoral district of Niagara Centre as a member of the Ontario New Democratic Party.

Prior to his election to the legislature Burch was the executive director of Niagara Folk Arts, a non–profit social services agency, and served as city councillor for Merritton Ward for St. Catharines City Council.

Background
Jeff Burch is a graduate from Brock University, with an honours BA in philosophy. Burch then spent three years as a graduate student and teaching assistant at Brock, teaching seminars in social issues and women's studies. He left his studies in 1996 after being elected president of a United Steelworkers local union.

Politics
Burch ran as the Ontario New Democratic Party's candidate in St. Catharines in 1995, losing to Liberal Jim Bradley. He was elected as a city councillor in St. Catharines, Ontario, in 2006. He served from 2006 to 2014, including four years as budget chair. He ran for mayor of St. Catharines in 2014, losing to Walter Sendzik by fewer than 2000 votes.

In February 2018, Burch won the NDP nomination in Niagara Centre. The riding has been an NDP stronghold for 44 years with Mel Swart, Peter Kormos and Cindy Forster holding the seat. On June 8, 2019, Burch won the seat.
Burch currently serves as the Official Opposition critic for Municipal Affairs.

Three months after his election in 2018, he scored a major victory by winning unanimous support for his motion to bring two-way all-day GO Transit rail service to Niagara.

Electoral record

2014 St. Catharines Mayoral Election

2010 St. Catharines City Council Election - Ward 1 - Merriton

2006 St. Catharines City Council Election - Ward 1 - Meritton

References

Living people
Ontario New Democratic Party MPPs
21st-century Canadian politicians
St. Catharines city councillors
Year of birth missing (living people)